L band may refer to:
 L band, as defined by the IEEE, a radio frequency band from 1 to 2 GHz
 L band (infrared), an atmospheric transmission window centred on 3.5 μm
 L band (NATO), a millimetre wave band from 40 to 60 GHz
 1565 nm to 1625 nm, a transmission window in fiber-optic communication